The sixth and final competition weekend of the 2018–19 ISU Speed Skating World Cup was held at the Utah Olympic Oval in Salt Lake City, United States, from Sunday, 9 March, until Sunday, 10 March 2019.

Schedule
The detailed event schedule:

Medal summary

Men's events

Women's events

Standings
Standings after completion of the event.

Men

500 m

1000 m

1500 m

Long distance

Mass start

Women

500 m

1000 m

1500 m

Long distance

Mass start

References

6
ISU World Cup, 2018-19, 6
ISU Speed Skating